Frank Cole (9 August 1912 – 26 November 1995) was a British basketball player. He competed in the men's tournament at the 1948 Summer Olympics.

References

External links
 

1912 births
1995 deaths
British men's basketball players
Olympic basketball players of Great Britain
Basketball players at the 1948 Summer Olympics
Place of birth missing